Edwin Joseph Skinner (born 15 October 1940) was a Trinidadian athlete who competed mainly in the 400 metres.

He competed for Trinidad and Tobago in the 1964 Summer Olympics held in Tokyo, Japan in the 4 x 400 metre relay where he won the bronze medal with his team mates Kent Bernard, Edwin Roberts and Wendell Mottley.

References

Sports Reference

Trinidad and Tobago male sprinters
Olympic bronze medalists for Trinidad and Tobago
Athletes (track and field) at the 1964 Summer Olympics
Olympic athletes of Trinidad and Tobago
1940 births
Living people
Athletes (track and field) at the 1966 British Empire and Commonwealth Games
Commonwealth Games competitors for Trinidad and Tobago
Medalists at the 1964 Summer Olympics
Olympic bronze medalists in athletics (track and field)
Central American and Caribbean Games medalists in athletics
Central American and Caribbean Games silver medalists for Trinidad and Tobago
Competitors at the 1966 Central American and Caribbean Games